Hector Hammond is a supervillain appearing in American comic books published by DC Comics who is primarily an enemy of Green Lantern.

Peter Sarsgaard played the role of Hammond in the 2011 film Green Lantern.

Publication history
Hector Hammond originally appeared in Green Lantern (vol. 2) #5 (March–April 1961) and was created by John Broome and Gil Kane.

Fictional character biography
The character Hammond is a petty criminal on the run from the law when he discovers the fragments of a strange meteor in the woods (later retconned as part of the same meteor that lands in Africa, super-evolving Gorilla Grodd and the other gorillas of Gorilla City). Observing that radiation from the meteor caused the nearby plants to evolve rapidly, Hammond kidnaps four scientists and exposes them to the meteor on a remote island. The radiation causes their intellects to evolve, but also has the side effect of sapping their wills. Hammond forces the scientists to use their heightened intellect to create amazing new inventions, which Hammond sells for his own profit.

Hammond rapidly becomes a rich celebrity due to the wealth he has acquired. Green Lantern Hal Jordan asks his friend and mechanic, Thomas Kalmaku, to take on the role of the Green Lantern while Jordan investigates Hammond. Jordan creates a duplicate power ring and costume for Kalmaku to fool Hammond and tells him to fly above Coast City so it would be thought Green Lantern was there. The scientists tried to use a device to bring this Green Lantern to them, but the ring was first pulled off his finger and fell on the island where Hammond found it. Unaware of the impersonation, Hammond steals his ring and turns Kalmaku into a chimpanzee. Jordan confronts Hammond personally in a battle of power rings that ends only when the charge of Hammond's ring runs out, allowing Jordan to capture him and restore Kalmaku and the scientists. He removes the scientists' memory of their knowledge and gets rid of the inventions as well.

Hammond returns in Justice League of America #14 (September 1962). He manages to escape from prison and deliberately exposes himself to the meteorite. The radiation causes his brain to grow to enormous size, granting him psionic powers as well as immortality. He captures Green Lantern using a "de-memorizer" invented by Amos Fortune, but he is later captured. His body later becomes immobilized, and he loses the power to speak. Trapped in a motionless state, Hammond is still able to use his psionic powers to control the minds of others. He attempts to steal Green Lantern's ring, but Jordan manages to command his ring to drain itself of power when it leaves his finger, after which Jordan renders Hammond unconscious.

Hammond is responsible for the creation of the second Royal Flush Gang in Justice League of America #203 (June 1982). He and the Gang are defeated when Dr. Martin Stein, half of the superhero Firestorm, subdues Hammond on the astral plane. Hammond is later involved with erasing the world's memories of the JLA in Justice Leagues. In addition to battling Hal Jordan, Hammond has also fought Green Lanterns Alan Scott and Kyle Rayner.

After Green Lantern: Rebirth
Following the 2004-2005 miniseries Green Lantern: Rebirth, in which Hal Jordan is resurrected, vindicated for his past crimes, and returned as the star of the Green Lantern core series, Hammond reappears as one of his adversaries. After his capture and further experimentation by the Kroloteans (the aliens who sent the meteor that gave him his powers), he seems to have recovered the ability to speak without using telepathy.

Hammond appears in Infinite Crisis: Villains United special, in which he is broken out of prison along with several other supervillains and was seen as a member of Alexander Luthor, Jr.'s Secret Society of Super Villains.

Green Lantern: Secret Origin
Hammond appears in the 2008 storyline Green Lantern: Secret Origin, a re-telling of Hal Jordan's first days as a Green Lantern. In that storyline, Hammond aspires to be Carol Ferris' boyfriend, feelings that are not reciprocated by Ferris, who merely went out to one dinner with him for business purposes as he is a private consultant for Ferris Aircraft. While inspecting Abin Sur's crashed spacecraft, Hammond is affected by the meteorite fragment used as a power source in its reactor which results in an increase in his brain size and telepathic abilities, with which he learns Jordan is a Green Lantern. He attempts to use his telepathy to keep Hal from using his ring, but is thwarted by Sinestro. It is revealed that Hammond wants the power of a god to gain revenge on Hal Jordan/Green Lantern.

Brightest Day
Hammond's telepathic thoughts are shown from Belle Reve Prison, stating, "It has Parallax" after an unknown force pulled Parallax away. Afterwards, Krona helps Hammond exit prison to pursue the entity trapped inside Larfleeze's lantern. Hammond attacks Larfleeze and Hal Jordan and during the fight manages to swallow Larfleeze's battery, allowing the entity, Ophidian, to possess his body just as Parallax possessed Hal's. The battle with Ophidian does not go very well for Hal or Larfleeze. While fleeing Ophidian, Larfleeze admits that he was not entirely honest about his ownership of the orange lantern and that he and Ophidian have a rather antagonistic relationship; however, he is quick to blame Ophidian for starting whatever it was that came between them. Ophidian states that Larfleeze was the only being in the universe capable of resisting his temptations, thereby allowing Larfleeze to subdue him and become Agent Orange and now it is Larfleeze's turn to be subdued and used by Ophidian. Ophidian then attempts to devour Larfleeze, but he is saved by Hal. After that, the desires of Hector begin to override those of Ophidian and he leaves to search for his ultimate desire: "Carol Ferris".

Ophidian would later apparently reassert its hold on Hector as he joins Krona and helps the renegade Guardian of the Universe discover the location of the Butcher and was last seen returning with Krona to Ryut where he began purging the universe of all emotionally unbalanced beings.

Hector's fate afterwards remains unknown as the Orange Battery is seen in the Book of the Black which prompted Larfleeze to try to recover it only to be trapped himself in the Book and Ophidian is seen without its host, launching, along with the other entities and Krona, an attack on Oa, where it possessed a Guardian of the Universe.

The New 52
In September 2011, The New 52 rebooted DC's continuity. In this new timeline, Hector Hammond first appears in Superman #18, seen comatose as a prisoner in S.T.A.R Labs, where he suddenly recovers the ability to dream. However, when Orion arrives in the lab looking for Superman, he detects Hammond to be brain dead and leaves.

Hammond is seen in an uneasy alliance with the H.I.V.E. He later plays an important role in the Superman: Psi War story arc. His comatose body is stolen from S.T.A.R. Labs by H.I.V.E. agents. The H.I.V.E. Queen's plan is to use his considerable mental powers to mentally enslave the world in preparation for Brainiac's return. However, by chance, a live cable in his life support system becomes loose. It electrocutes Hammond, awakening him from his medically induced coma. The electrocution also boosts his powers, and he connects with the minds of every citizen in Metropolis, causing them to act strange and attract Superman's attention. He breaks into H.I.V.E.'s headquarters located beneath Metropolis and confronts the H.I.V.E. Queen. Once she makes it clear that it is not an alliance she is seeking and that she merely sees him as a means to an end, he overpowers her and takes over her organization. However, she manages to escape and initiates an attack that takes over the city. With the knowledge of her plan, Hector sends an astral projection to her location and engages the Queen in battle using the citizens of Metropolis as soldiers. Once she discovers Hammond is just a psionic avatar, she retreats back to her base, intent on retaking it. However, both Hammond and the H.I.V.E. Queen are overpowered by the Psycho Pirate and have their powers drained. The Pirate then confronts and drains Superman only to be attacked by Lois Lane, who had been developing psychic powers of her own. Recovering, Hammond proposes a truce between the heroes and the Queen who had barely survived the Pirate's attack. The telepaths fight the Psycho Pirate but are beaten again. Once Roger Hayden is defeated, he, the H.I.V.E. Queen, and Hammond disappear in the aftermath.

During the Forever Evil storyline, Hector Hammond is among the villains recruited by the Crime Syndicate of America to join the Secret Society of Super Villains.

In the Watchmen sequel Doomsday Clock, Hector Hammond is among the villains that attend the underground meeting held by Riddler where they talk about the Superman Theory.

DC Rebirth
While imprisoned at Ryker's Island, Hammond is captured by a squad of Kroloteans who intend to weaponize his vast mental powers. Hammond succeeds in contacting Hal Jordan and Superman who arrive and defeat the Kroloteans after fighting through an illusion generated by Hammond. Furious, Hammond kills the Kroloteans and confesses to Hal that he is tired of everyone wanting to control him. He then tries to commit suicide by making Superman shoot him with his heat vision, but Hal stops this, and the shot instead puts Hammond into a coma. Just before losing consciousness, he says that Hal was his hero.

During the Darkstars Rising storyline, Hal breaks into Ryker's Island to try and recruit Hammond to combat the threat of the Darkstars. He instead encounters a reformed Atomic Skull who tries to stop him. Hammond awakens from his coma and subdues Atomic Skull, nearly killing him, but Green Lantern convinces him otherwise. Expressing excitement at the opportunity to finally become a hero, Hammond agrees to help Green Lantern. Accompanying Hal to a frozen planet, Hammond is delighted to finally be able to explore space. Seeking to prove his newfound loyalty to Green Lantern, Hammond instead erases Hal's memories to keep him out of harm's way and declares his intention to kill every villain in the universe. Hal regains his identity and powers, leading Hammond to explain that his actions were to show Green Lantern that his guilt over his failures were just thoughts and not actions. During the battle between the Green Lantern Corps and the Darkstars, Hammond plays a vital role by disrupting the Controllers’ psionic powers, leaving their entire army in disarray. Hammond seemingly disappears in the aftermath.

Infinite Frontier
Hammond reappears in DC's Infinite Frontier era, spearheading the Department of Extranormal Operations' aggressive work to contain Multiverse visitors and resurrected heroes. His deformities are gone; he looks like a normal man; he explains to Roy Harper that he was "reset to the factory settings" when "reality returned" (the conclusion of Dark Nights: Death Metal).

Powers and abilities
Hammond in his mutated state exhibits genius level intellect, as well as potent telepathic and telekinetic abilities including mind reading, mind control, astral projection, levitation, projection of harmful psionic blasts, moving physical objects with his mind, and on occasion displays the ability to absorb and mentally redirect Green Lantern's emerald plasma. In some incarnations, his body has atrophied to the point where he cannot walk and he has to strap his head to a chair to support its weight.

As the host of Ophidian, he has access to the powers of an Orange Lantern, without needing an orange power ring to access them.

Other versions

Flashpoint
In the alternate timeline of the Flashpoint event, Hector Hammond did not become a villain from a meteorite fragment. Instead, Hammond works as a private consultant to Ferris Aircraft with his test pilots Hal Jordan and Carol Ferris. While inspecting Abin Sur's crashed spacecraft, Hammond does not trust Abin Sur and believes him to be preparing an alien invasion. However, the engineer Thomas Kalmaku tells him to rebuke his statement. Later, Hammond modifies the F-35 and assigns Hal Jordan to pilot it against the Amazons' Air Force of invisible planes.

Captain Carrot and His Amazing Zoo Crew!
The 1980s series Captain Carrot and His Amazing Zoo Crew! presented the parallel Earth of "Earth-C-Minus", a world populated by talking animal superheroes that paralleled the mainstream DC Universe. Earth-C-Minus features "Hector Hamhock", a pig counterpart of Hammond whose nemesis was the heroic Green Lambkin.

Amalgam Comics
Hammond was combined with Marvel Comics' MODOK to create HECTOR, the Highly Evolved Creature Totally Oriented for Revenge. He resembles Hector Hammond, but with a larger spherical head, yellow eyes, a large black goatee, a smaller body, MODOK's laser cannon on his forehead and a red and yellow uniform.

In other media

 Hector Hammond appears in Green Lantern, portrayed by Peter Sarsgaard. This version is a xenobiology professor, an old friend of Hal Jordan, and the son of Senator Robert Hammond. After being summoned by Amanda Waller of the Department of Extranormal Operations (DEO) to conduct an autopsy on Abin Sur's body, he is infected with Parallax's DNA hidden in Abin's wounds, which grants him psychic powers and a mental link to Parallax. Despite being driven insane and slowly becoming wheelchair-bound, Hammond takes a liking to his newfound powers, kills his father, and attempts to kill Jordan on Parallax's orders. After taking Carol Ferris hostage and stealing Jordan's power ring, Jordan eventually defeats Hammond, who is subsequently killed by Parallax for his failure.
 Hector Hammond appears as an assist character in Scribblenauts Unmasked: A DC Comics Adventure. This version has more visible facial hair, a larger, veiny head, and is able to move and fly without the use of his chair.
 Hector Hammond appears in the Teen Titans Go! episode "Orangins".

References

External links
 GLC Web Page
 History of Hector Hammond

Characters created by Gil Kane
Characters created by John Broome
Comics characters introduced in 1961
DC Comics film characters
DC Comics male supervillains
DC Comics metahumans
DC Comics telekinetics 
DC Comics telepaths 
Fictional avatars
Fictional characters with absorption or parasitic abilities
Fictional characters with energy-manipulation abilities
Fictional fugitives
Green Lantern characters